Black Fire is a Star Trek: The Original Series novel written by Sonni Cooper.

Plot
An explosion destroys the bridge of the Enterprise, killing trainee crewmembers and severely injuring the main crew. Spock ignores a chunk of metal in his spine to take command and figure out exactly what happened.

His investigation soon leads him and the Enterprises Chief Engineer Montgomery Scott to the discovery of the Tomarii, an alien race who reveres war and conflict. Despite being urged by Scott and others to take the time to have his injuries treated, Spock refuses to do so. Scott and Spock meet with a small grouping of Romulans and Klingons, all three races having been attacked. The grouping is captured by the Tomarii, who use them in other conflicts.

Meanwhile, Spock has been framed for the explosion and Captain Kirk, recovering from his own wounds, must clear his friend's name.

External links

Novels based on Star Trek: The Original Series
1983 American novels
American science fiction novels
Novels set in the 23rd century